Sharon Marcus (born May 19, 1966) is an American academic. She is currently the Orlando Harriman Professor of English and Comparative Literature at Columbia University. She specializes in nineteenth-century British and French literature and culture, and teaches courses on the 19th-century novel in England and France, particularly in relation to the history of urbanism and architecture; gender and sexuality studies; narrative theory; and 19th-century theater and performance. Marcus has received Fulbright, Woodrow Wilson, Guggenheim Fellowship, and ACLS fellowships, and a Gerry Lenfest Distinguished Faculty Award at Columbia. She is one of the senior editors of Public Culture, as well as a founding editor and Fiction Review Editor of Public Books.

Early life and education 
Marcus was born on May 19, 1966 in New York City. She received her B.A. from Brown University and her Ph.D. from the Johns Hopkins University Humanities Center.

Career 
Marcus is the author of Apartment Stories: City and Home in Nineteenth-Century Paris and London (University of California Press, 1999), which received an honorable mention for the MLA Scaglione Prize for best book in comparative literature, and Between Women: Friendship, Desire, and Marriage in Victorian England (Princeton: 2007). Between Women has been translated into Spanish and won the Perkins Prize for best study of narrative, the Albion prize for best book on Britain after 1800, the Alan Bray Memorial award for best book in queer studies, and a Lambda Literary award for best book in LGBT studies. With Stephen Best, she edited a special issue of Representations on "The Way We Read Now" that has been important within the growing field, in literary criticism and cultural studies, of postcritique.

Before joining Columbia in 2003, Marcus taught for many years at the University of California, Berkeley.

Personal life 
Marcus was married to writer Ellis Avery until the latter's death in 2019.

Publications

Books
*

Articles
"Fighting Bodies, Fighting Words: A Theory and Politics of Rape Prevention" (1992)

References
Sharon Marcus papers, 1989-2016, Pembroke Center Archives, Brown University

Living people
Columbia University faculty
Brown University alumni
Johns Hopkins University alumni
LGBT academics
LGBT women
University of California, Berkeley faculty
1966 births